{{DISPLAYTITLE:C5H11O8P}}
The molecular formula C5H11O8P (molar mass: 230.11 g/mol, exact mass: 230.0192 u) may refer to:

 Ribulose 5-phosphate
 Ribose 5-phosphate
 Xylulose 5-phosphate (D-xylulose-5-P)